Lotoha'apai United (formerly SC Lotoha'apai) is a Tongan football club located in Veitongo, Tonga. It currently plays in Tonga Major League. The team is record champion of the league and made its continental debut in the 1999 Oceania Club Championship preliminary round.

Titles
Tonga Major League: 16
1998, 1999, 2000, 2001, 2002, 2003, 2004, 2005, 2006, 2007, 2008, 2011, 2012, 2013, 2014, 2018

Squad for the 2019 OFC Champions League Preliminary stage

Former players

  Alexandre Casillas
  Oscar Garcia

Continental competition

OFC Champions League top scorers

No goalscorers for 1999 and 2005 are missing.

References

 
Football clubs in Tonga